Michael Andrew Hakopian, better known as Pinchface is the drummer of the Deli Creeps, Giant Robot II, and the Cornbugs. He has also appeared on numerous Buckethead albums, such as Population Override and Giant Robot (tracks "I Come In Peace" and "Star Wars"). He has also appeared on numerous occasions in Buckethead's Binge Clip Videos. In 2006 he toured the United States with Buckethead and Delray Brewer. He also works as a real estate agent according to his Facebook page.

Discography

With the Deli Creeps
 Demo Tape - 1991
 Demo Tape - 1996
 Dawn of the Deli Creeps - 2005

With Buckethead
 Giant Robot - 1994
 Population Override - 2004

With Gorgone
 Gorgone - 2005

With Cobra Strike
 13th Scroll - 1999

With Cornbugs
 Spot the Psycho - 1999
 How Now Brown Cow - 2001
 Brain Circus - 2004
 Donkey Town - 2004

Videography
 Young Buckethead Vol. 1 - 2006
 Young Buckethead Vol. 2 - 2006

References 

Living people
American heavy metal drummers
American people of Armenian descent
Deli Creeps members
Cornbugs members
Year of birth missing (living people)